Kudumbam may refer to:

 Kudumbam (1954 film), a Tamil-language film directed by Jampana
 Kudumbam (1967 film), a Malayalam-language film directed by M. Krishnan Nair
 Kudumbam (1984 film), a Tamil-language film directed by S. A. Chandrasekhar